Zeljko Susa (born 13 July 1978 in Australia) is an Australian retired soccer player of Croatian descent who played in the Australian National Soccer League (NSL) for Melbourne Knights and South Melbourne as well as for the Australian national football team. He made 17 appearances for the Socceroos from 1998 to 2003. Susa made his debut in Australia’s 0-1 loss to Chile at Olympic Park, Melbourne on the 7th of February 1998. Susa received the opportunity to make a transfer to Deportivo Alavés in Spain, however the lucrative £500,000 offer was rejected by the Melbourne Knights Football Club.  He had a short stint with Hadjuk Split where he played twice, scoring one goal.

References

Living people
Melbourne Knights FC players
South Melbourne FC players
HNK Hajduk Split players
1978 births
Australian soccer players
Australian expatriate soccer players
Expatriate footballers in Croatia
Association football defenders
Australian people of Croatian descent